The Professional Graduate Certificate in Education (ProfGCE) is an award in England and Wales for undergraduate degree holders that attended the Postgraduate Certificate in Education (PGCE) and trained to be a teacher. It is very similar and enables candidates to gain their Qualified Teacher Status (QTS), but does not carry credits towards a master's degree of which the PGCE provides 60. It sits on the Honours Level of the Framework for Higher Education Qualifications (FHEQ), a level lower than the Postgraduate Certificate in Education.
The Professional Graduate Certificate in Education level 6 is also a stand-alone qualification for those wishing to become a teacher in the post-compulsory sector or an advanced pathway for those completing a Diploma in Education and Training level 5. Completion of the Diploma / Professional Graduate Certificate (typically two years part-time) allows you to apply for Qualified Teacher Learning and Skills (QTLS) status.

Professional titles and certifications
Educational qualifications in the United Kingdom